The black-necklaced honeyeater or black-chested honeyeater (Lichmera notabilis) is a species of bird in the family Meliphagidae.
It is endemic to Wetar.

Its natural habitats are subtropical or tropical moist lowland forests, subtropical or tropical moist shrubland, and rural gardens.
It is threatened by habitat loss.

References

black-necklaced honeyeater
Birds of Wetar
black-necklaced honeyeater
Taxonomy articles created by Polbot